Varma is a crater on Mercury.  Its name was adopted by the International Astronomical Union (IAU) on June 18, 2013. Varma is named for the Indian painter Raja Ravi Varma.

Varma is east of the slightly smaller crater Rikyū.

References

Impact craters on Mercury